At the beginning of 2016, more than a hundred parliamentarians from more than 40 countries in the Korean Parliament founded the International Association of Parliamentarians for Peace, based on the "Parliamentarians for Peace" initiative launched by the founders of the Universal Peace Federation, Rev. Sun Myung Moon and Dr. Hak Ja Han Moon in 2001.

The main vision behind the launch of the International Association of Parliamentarians for Peace is to provide a platform for parliamentarians from different countries to use their experience to help find concrete solutions to world problems.

The International Association of Parliamentarians for Peace has already been launched in several countries of the world, including Nepal, Burkina Faso, the United Kingdom, Costa Rica, Paraguay, Zambia, Japan and the United States, in the first year of its establishment and operation.

Dan Burton from the state of Indiana, USA, a former member of the US Congress, and Jose de Venecia, a former speaker of the Philippine Parliament were the first Co- Chairmans of the International Association of Parliamentarians for peace.

Resolution from the founding meeting 

During the establishment of the International Association of Parliamentarians for Peace in South Korea, a joint resolution was adopted.

Recognizing the current problems in the world such as religious conflicts, climate change, hunger and others, and especially pointing out the serious danger of the development of North Korea's nuclear program to peace in the world, the parliamentary representatives call on the international community to get involved in solving all these problems.

At the founding assembly, parliamentarians called on all people to work together to build sustainable and lasting peace in the world, while overcoming ideological, national, racial and other limitations, in accordance with publicly published information on the organization's official website.

A similar resolution was adopted at the Inaugural Conference of the International Association of Parliamentarians for Peace, Balkans, in September 2017.

Goals 
The International Association of Parliamentarians for Peace supports the work of the UN, and cooperate with other related organizations, including those that gather parliamentarians from other countries.

The main goals of The International Association of Parliamentarians for Peace are the following: 

 Promote good governance in society
 Quality education for parliamentarians;
 To initiate communication and cooperation among parliamentarians around the world to promote and build peace
 Promote the dignity and value of all people, as members of one universal family
 To strengthen and promote the family as the central unit of society
 To encourage mutual trust and cooperation among all nations and
 To encourage cooperation between different religions of the world and to create a foundation for peace in the world

Asia-Pacific Summit 2019 

The 2019 Asia-Pacific Summit was held in November 2019 in Phnom Penh, Cambodia. The summit was attended by almost 2,000 people, including several hundred delegates from more than 40 countries. Prime Minister of Cambodia Hun Sen also gave a speech at the summit. He called on representatives of governments and private organizations to work together in solving global crises.

Prime Minister Hun Sen called on all participants of the summit to cooperate in solving global challenges such as climate change, radicalism, gender inequality, human trafficking and other problems in the world.

The co-organizers of the summit were the Royal Government of Cambodia and the Universal Peace Federation, and in coordination with the International Association of Parliamentarians for Peace and other related organizations. 

At the 2019 Asia-Pacific Summit, the Prime Minister of Cambodia, Hun Sen, received a special recognition from Dr. Hak Ja Han Moon, co-founder of the Universal Peace Federation, "Leadership and Good Governance" Award.

Chapters

References 

Peace organizations
Unification Church affiliated organizations
Parliamentary assemblies